The Dubai Metro is a rapid transit rail network in the city of Dubai, United Arab Emirates. It is currently operated by a consortium of the French company Keolis and Japanese Company MHI as Keolis-MHI. The Red Line and Green Line are operational, with a major 15 km (9.3 mi) extension to the Red Line known as Route 2020 to the Expo 2020 site announced in April 2015 and opened in 2021. These first two lines run underground in the city centre and on elevated viaducts elsewhere. All trains are fully automated and driverless, and, together with stations, are air conditioned with platform edge doors. Architecture firm Aedas designed the metro's 45 stations, two depots and operational control centers. The Al Ghurair Investment group were the metro's builders.

The first section of the Red Line, covering 10 stations, was ceremonially inaugurated at 9:09:09 pm on 9 September 2009, by Mohammed bin Rashid Al Maktoum, Ruler of Dubai, with the line opening to the public at 6 am (UTC 04:00) on 10 September. The Dubai Metro is the first urban train network in the Arabian Peninsula and either the second in the Arab World (after the Cairo Metro) or the third (if the surface-level, limited-service Baghdad Metro is counted). It is the fourth in the Middle East, as Iran and Israel also have Metros.

More than 110,000 people, or nearly 10 percent of Dubai's population, used the Metro in its first two days of operation. The Dubai Metro carried 10 million passengers from launch on 9 September 2009 to 9 February 2010 with 11 stations operational on the Red Line. Engineering consultancy Atkins provided full multidisciplinary design and management of the civil works on Dubai Metro.

The system was surpassed by the Vancouver SkyTrain in 2016 for the longest fully automated system in the world but regained the title in 2021 with the opening of Route 2020. However, its total route length have since been surpassed by the automated lines of the Singapore MRT.

Construction

Planning of the Dubai Metro began under the directive of Dubai's Ruler, Sheikh Mohammed bin Rashid Al Maktoum, who expected other projects to attract 15 million visitors to Dubai by 2010. The combination of a rapidly growing population (expected to reach 3 million by 2017) and severe traffic congestion necessitated the building of an urban rail system to provide additional public transportation capacity, relieve motor traffic, and provide infrastructure for additional development.

In 2004, five consortium were shortlisted to build the first section:
Bilfinger Berger, Taisei Corporation, Besix & Alstom
Vinci, Hochtief, CCIC & Ansaldo
Obayashi, Yapı Merkezi & Mitsubishi
Odebrecht, Parsons & Bombardier
Saudi Binladin Group, Diwidag & Siemens

In May 2005, a AED 12.45 billion/US$3.4 billion design and build contract was awarded to the Dubai Rail Link (DURL) consortium made up of Japanese companies including Mitsubishi Heavy Industries, Mitsubishi Corporation, Obayashi Corporation, Kajima Corporation and Turkish firm Yapı Merkezi, and the Project Management ('The Engineer') and Construction Management services contract awarded to a French-American joint venture between Systra and Parsons Corporation. This was to be completed by June 2010. A second phase contract was subsequently signed in July 2006 and includes extensions to the initial routes. The Red Line partially opened at 9 minutes and 9 seconds past 9 pm on 9 September 2009 (9/9/9 9:09:09 PM), inaugurated by Sheikh Mohammed bin Rashid Al Maktoum.

Cost issues
The construction cost of the Dubai Metro project has shot up by about 80 percent from the original AED 15.5 billion/US$4.2 billion to AED 28 billion/US$7.8 billion. The authorities contradicted this, saying that the cost of the project did not overshoot. They attributed the increase in expenditure to the major changes in the scope and design of the project. The authorities also expect to generate AED 18 billion/US$4.9 billion in income over the next 10 years, but they speculate that the Metro would not be a profit-making enterprise since the fares would be subsidized.

Delays

Work officially commenced on the construction of the metro on 21 March 2006. In February 2009, an RTA Rail Agency official stated the US$4.2 billion Dubai Metro project would be completed on schedule despite the global crisis. However, only 10 out of 29 metro stations of the Red Line opened on 9 September 2009.

Construction of the 18 stations on the Red Line and another 18 on the Green Line restarted on 7 February 2010, according to contractors, after a settlement was reached with a Japanese-led consortium over disputed payments of about US$2 billion–US$3 billion. Construction of all 29 metro stations on the Red Line was declared complete on 28 April 2010 by the acting chief of the RTA Rail Agency.

Seven more stations on the Dubai Metro Red Line opened on 30 April 2010. Ten new trains were pressed into service, giving a total of 22 trains in service when the stations opened. The seven stations are Emirates Station, Airport Terminal 1 Station, Dubai Internet City (TECOM) Station, Al Karama Station (now ADCB), Emirates Towers Station, Dubai Marina Station (now SOBHA REALTY), and Ibn Battuta Station. In addition to this, a further three stations were opened on 15 May 2010; GGICO Station and World Trade Center Station. Furthermore, Business Bay Station, First Gulf Bank Station (Now First Abu Dhabi Bank), mashreq (Al Barsha) Station, Al Khail (Emirates Golf Club) Station, and Jumeirah Lakes Towers Station (Now DMCC) were opened on 15 October 2010. After much delay, Jebel Ali Station, the terminus of the Red Line on the Abu Dhabi side was opened on 11 March 2011, and Jebel Ali Industrial Station, renamed Danube Station, was opened on 12 December 2012. The final two stations, Al Jadaf and Creek, on the Green Line were opened on 1 March 2014.

Operation

The Dubai Metro is operated by keolis under contract to the Roads & Transport Authority. It has been renewed a number of times, most recently in March 2019. In March 2021, the French-Japanese consortium of Keolis and Mitsubishi Heavy Industries was announced as a new operator from 8 September 2021.

Red Line trains run every 5 to 7 minutes off-peak (averaging 8.5 trains per hour), with a minimum headway of 3 minutes 45 seconds (16 trains per hour) during peak hours, with 44 trainsets in service. Trains from the Red Line and Green Line can depart differently due to technical glitches. From 2010, when 51 trains were in service, the line had a peak-hour capacity of 11,675 passengers per hour in each direction. , the Red Line operates 60 trains (train registrations 5001–5045, 5065–5079) The theoretical maximum design capacity is 25,720 passengers per hour, which would require 106 trains.

The Green Line had an initial capacity of 6,395 passengers per hour per direction, with 19 trains (train registrations 5046–5064) in service as of September 2014. The design capacity of this route is put at 13,380 passengers per hour with 60 trains in service.

Ridership
Over 280,000 passengers used the Dubai Metro during the first week of its operation.

Before launch, Dubai Municipality Public Transport Department expected the metro to provide transport for 12% of all trips in Dubai. After the first month of operation (on a limited network), the monthly total was 1,740,578 passengers, which equates to under 60,000 passengers/day. After the opening of more stations in May 2010, ridership surged to 103,002 passengers/day and reached 130,000/day by the beginning of October 2010. When the Green Line opened on 9 September 2011, passengers on the Red Line was noted as 180,000/day. In 2013, passengers rose to 377,000/day, split 64% for the Red Line and 36% for the Green Line. During the first half of 2015, RTA announced that 88,252,034 passengers have used the metro. In August 2017, RTA announced that total ridership since 2009 had surpassed 1 billion total trips.

One issue for the new system was how to reliably and comfortably get riders to their final destination if it is not located near a metro station. The RTA has added "feeder bus routes" also known as Metro link buses. Seen in Blue and White. Which act as shuttle services to and from major locations in and around the station area. There are bus and taxi laybys constructed as well as drop off zones at each station for ease of passenger access.

In addition 268 km of light rail lines are also planned, these will serve as feeders to the Dubai Metro. The Dubai Tram is one of the light rail plans.

Signalling
To permit fully automated operation, Thales Rail Signalling Solutions is supplying its SelTrac IS communications-based train control and NetTrac central control technology. This is configured for a minimum headway of 90 seconds (40 trains per hour).

Lines

Existing

The first two lines of the Dubai Metro have  of lines, and 47 stations (nine of them being underground). The red line stretches along the city from the Jebel Ali area to the border with Sharjah. It passes through several tourist attractions such as Mall of the Emirates, The Dubai Mall and Burj Khalifa. The green line, on the other hand, stays within the old Dubai area. It passes through many historical sites, such as the Dubai Museum, the Gold Souk, the Spice Souk among others. Because of that, many stations near those places are themed on the history of Dubai, with photos depicting the UAE in the 1960s or earlier being on display within the station. Some stations are even specially designed with the architecture of traditional Emirati houses, mirroring the architecture in the surrounding area.

Latest finished projects
Route 2020: A 15 kilometer (9 mi) extension with seven new stations (including two underground) already built which starts at the Jebel Ali Station and ending at the Expo 2020 Site. Future plans will also extend this line to the Al Maktoum International Airport. The extension is served by new, redesigned trains from Alstom. The extension opened in stages in 2021. Since Red Line trains now run directly on the new track to Expo 2020, the Red Line section from Jabal Ali to UAE Exchange is now run as a branch.

Summary of lines

Proposed
In 2011, the RTA stated that there are no "immediate plans" to build the Blue and Purple lines "in the next five or six years". This is mainly because the planned area is empty and developing.

 Purple Line: along Al Khail Road (E44). The line will extend from the Al Maktoum International Airport to Muhaisnah, a locality near the border between Dubai and Sharjah. There will be about eight stations, three with check-in facilities. However, The Dubai Airports Authority claimed that this was unfeasible as it did not pass through many localities. They however suggested opting for a "central terminal" similar to those in Europe where trains leave from inside the airport to the other airport with trains also leaving to the city. The RTA have taken this into consideration.
Blue Line: along Sheikh Mohammed Bin Zayed Road (E311).
Pink Line: The Pink Line is planned to run east–west with a terminus at Al Sufouh and is scheduled for completion by 2030.
Gold Line: Announced as the 'Yellow Line' in April 2008 and confirmed in January 2013 as the 'Gold Line'. One of the stations planned for the Gold Line is the Dubailand Station, west of Meydan. The Gold Line will connect Arabian Ranches, Deira, and Dubai Marina and is scheduled to open by 2025.
 Red Line Extension:  and six new stations, terminating at the border with Abu Dhabi.  No dates for completion announced.
 Green Line Extension: The line could be further extended by 11 km from Al Jaddaf to International City under the Green Line extension project.

In 2014, the RTA approved the recent proposal of extending the Red Line from Al Rashidiya station to Mirdif City Center which will increase 3.5 kilometers with the new station. However, there is also a proposal to extend it further to Al Warqa’a which is currently being studied.

On the Green Line, the RTA finalized the extension plan of 20.6 kilometers from Al Jaddaf to Academic City in 2014. The extension is due to go through Festival City, Lagoons, Ras Al Khor Industrial Area, International City, Dubai Silicon Oasis, and Dubai Academic City.

In 2018, the engineering firm Aurecon produced a study into a 7.5 km express metro line from Al Qiyadah station on the Green Line till Sharjah. The line would cost AED 3 billion, and could reduce traffic congestion between the two cities by up to 30%.

Stations

Dubai Metro is composed of at-grade (G) elevated Type 1, Type 2 and Type 3 (T1, T2 and T3, respectively) underground stations (U) and underground transfer station types (UT). Type 1 is the regular at-grade concourse station, Type 2 is a regular elevated concourse station, and Type 3 is an elevated special track station with an extra track to hold a non-operational train. Underground transfer stations accommodate both the Red and Green lines for easy transfers.

Besides these differences, there are five themes used in the interiors of the stations: The red line individually has 29 stations including the Interchange Stations between Green Line. The green line has 20 stations including the Interchange Stations between Red Line. Route 2020 (Connected with the Red Line from Jebel Ali) individually has 7 stations in total (including Jebel Ali; 6 without it).

Inside the stations will have air conditions from 24 to 21 Celsius.
  
 Heritage: Symbolizes the culture and history of the United Arab Emirates.
 Earth: Marks the start of the Dubai modern and urban drive, which resembles the force and durability of earth and soil.
 Air: Symbolizes the elation and joy that Dubai provides to residents and visitors.
 Fire: Symbolizes the energy, vigour and strong will displayed by Dubai leaders.
 Water: Symbolizes the human values which Dubai seeks to ensure in its modern achievements.
The Earth stations have a tan-brown colour effects; water has blue-white colour effects; fire has orange-red colour effects; and the air has green colour effects.

Officials have negotiated with international and local companies over naming rights for 23 stations on the two lines. This corporate branding is the first of its kind. Some examples are: BurJuman, Burj Khalifa/Dubai Mall, Mall of the Emirates, DAMAC Properties and UAE Exchange.

Parking
The Dubai Metro has built three large multi-level car parking with an estimated capacity to accommodate more than 8,000 vehicles for the passengers where they can park their car and ride the metro. 

The parking is free for the metro users.

Handicapped facilities
All metro stations have elevators and contrasting tactile guidance path to guide the visually impaired. There are also dedicated spaces for wheelchair users on all the trains. Handicapped passengers, also known as 'people of determination' in the UAE, can ride with any RTA service for free with a special, personalized Nol Card.

Safety
Emergency stop buttons, intercoms and platform screen doors with corresponding flashing light signals are installed at every station for the safety of the passengers. Trains are equipped with emergency stop buttons, door release levers, intercoms and fire extinguishers. CCTV is operational throughout the entire network and in trains and police officers are regularly on patrol in the stations, especially during rush hours.

Telecommunication
Wi-Fi connectivity is available across all trains and stations which and is provided by du which is in par with the Wi-Fi UAE program which provides Wi-Fi connectivity across major parts of UAE. Mobile phone coverage is available across the entire network of the metro. The metro itself has Wi-Fi connectivity inside for the commuters to access with two tiers of Internet access with the normal service being free whereas the premium service can be accessed by a nominal fee.

Travelling
The Dubai Transport is divided into 4 tiers (5 zones). The prices were slightly increased as of 11 November 2014. The cheapest ticket (not preloaded, and not in the "gold" class) with a distance not more than 3 km cost 3 AED (about $0.82) – the equivalent of Tier 0, and most costly single trip (Tier 3, exceed 2 zones, and paper not preloaded ticket also) 7.5 AED (about $2.04) and was not increased from opening. Tier 1 is one zone trip, where the travel exceeds 3 km, Tier 2 is neighbouring 2 zones travel. Also (excluding Gold class) using cards there is "no more paying" – a free rest of day travel if the cost exceeds 14 AED (about $3.81).

Ticketing
The Dubai Metro has a fixed fare based on three tiers and travelling under 3 km costs 3 AED. The tiers are:

The Nol Card are used by the passengers to check-in and check-out at the gates in their destination station. No other payment form (cash, credit card) can be used. The fare will be automatically deducted based on the number of zones traveled. Passengers will be allowed to check-in when their card has more than minimum credit required.

Children below the age of 5 years or less than 90 cm and people with disabilities (personalized Nol Card required) will be eligible to travel the metro for free.

There is also a Nol Card available for students & seniors, and they can get a student & senior citizens' discount.

Rolling stock

Japanese manufacturer Kinki Sharyo built a total of 79 five-car trains (60 on Red Line, 19 on Green Line). They are designed to carry 643 seated and standing passengers, and unusually for a mass transit system, the trains have three classes of accommodation: Gold Class (first class), Women and Children class (a classification that is extended to a greater number of cars during the peak hours), and regular Silver Class (economy). The first train (5001) was delivered to Dubai in March 2008. The metro has driver less operation and uses third rail current collection. Trained wardens accompany passengers to help with emergencies. The four newer trains (5074, 5075, 5076, and 5077) are each painted with a different special livery, in which one of them (train 5077) representing the skyline of Dubai.

50 new trains, the Alstom Metropolis, were introduced in November 2018. The trains have higher capacity, 696 passengers, up from 643 passenger on the current trains. This will increase passenger capacity by about 10%. The new trains have a refreshed interior with better air conditioning, digital maps, improved speed, brakes and doors. Out of these 50 trains, 35 will run on the Red and Green lines while the remaining 15 will run on Route 2020, which partially opened at the start of 2021.

Guinness World Record
On 1 November 2018, as part of the RTA's Public Transport Day, the longest diverse human chain of hand was formed in a Dubai metro train at Etisalat station. The record was acknowledged by Guinness World Records. The chain was formed by people from 96 countries around the whole world. Previously this record was with Norway, where 75 nations made a diverse human chain.

Incidents and accidents
 
 
 
 
 
 
 3 April 2016 – Passengers were left stranded during evening rush hour after a technical snag delayed train services on the Red Line. Systems were restored in 30 minutes.
 24 August 2017 – A man commits suicide in Noor Bank Metro Station. The station was shut down for one hour following the incident. 
 6 November 2017 – Passengers commuting on the Red Line were left stranded after a technical glitch caused train services to temporarily stall specifically near Jumeirah Lakes Towers (now DMCC) and UAE Exchange stations. Services returned to normal at 12:32 PM.

Dubai Metro Museum
Sheikh Mohammed bin Rashid Al Maktoum, Vice President and Prime Minister of the UAE and Ruler of Dubai, gave his directions to transform Dubai Metro stations into art museums under the supervision of Dubai Culture and Arts Authority, The project was announced early April 2014 and aims at displaying contemporary and modern art.

See also
 Nol Card
 Dubai Tram
 Transportation in Dubai

References

External links

 Tour of the Dubai Metro – lines and principle stations on YouTube
 Dubai Metro Nol Card Balance Check
 Dubai Metro Timings

2009 establishments in the United Arab Emirates
Transport infrastructure completed in 2009
 
Roads and Transport Authority (Dubai)
Underground rapid transit in the United Arab Emirates
750 V DC railway electrification
keolis
Automated guideway transit